Sirik Rural District is a rural district (dehestan) in the Central of Sirik County, Hormozgan Province, Iran. At the 2006 census, its population was 11,311, in 1,909 families. The rural district has 16 villages.

References 

Rural Districts of Hormozgan Province
Sirik County